Mardanshah was a Sassanian general, the Arabs referred him to as Dhul Hājib (the "owner of bushy eyebrows") as was Bahman Jadhuyih.

See also
Battle of Muzayyah
Battle of the Bridge
Islamic conquest of Iran
Muslim conquests
Sassanid Empire

References

Generals of Yazdegerd III
642 deaths
Year of birth unknown
7th-century Iranian people